Kateryna Chumak (born ; December 7, 1988) is a Ukrainian handball player for Yenimahalle Bld. SK and the Ukrainian national team.

She played for HC Motor Zaporizhzhia (2005–2009) and Zaporizhzhia-ZSEA (2009–2011) in her country, in Poland (2012-2013) Nowy Sonz before she moved in 2013 to the Turkish team Muratpaşa Bld. SK, where she played one season. Currently she is with the Ankara-based Yenimahalle Bld. SK.

References

1988 births
Living people
Ukrainian female handball players
Sportspeople from Kyiv
Expatriate handball players in Turkey
Yenimahalle Bld. SK (women's handball) players
Ukrainian expatriate sportspeople in Turkey
Muratpaşa Bld. SK (women's handball) players
Ukrainian expatriate sportspeople in Poland